Commerce Street/South 11th Street station is a light rail station on Link light rail's T Line in Tacoma, Washington, United States. The station officially opened for service on September 15, 2011, as an infill station, and is located one block south of the Commerce Street transit mall, served by Sound Transit Express, Pierce Transit and Intercity Transit buses.

It was proposed by the City of Tacoma in 2010 and approved by the Sound Transit Board in September 2010. The station was officially named "Commerce Street" by a Sound Transit Board motion passed on July 28, 2011. Construction began in April 2010 and cost approximately $350,000. The station was built with  platforms, approximately half the length of other Tacoma Link stations.

On October 11, 2022, Commerce Street became the northern terminus of Line T following the closure of Theater District/South 9th Street station, which is planned to be relocated as part of the Hilltop Extension. Following the completion of the extension in 2023, Commerce Street will be renamed to Theater District, replacing the South 9th Street station. The name change was requested by the City of Tacoma and members of the community.

References

External links
Sound Transit Rider Guide

Link light rail stations in Pierce County, Washington
Railway stations in the United States opened in 2011
2011 establishments in Washington (state)
Buildings and structures in Tacoma, Washington
Transportation in Tacoma, Washington